Bernard Roger ( – ) was the count of Couserans, in which capacity he was lord of parts of Comminges and Foix.

Life
Bernard Roger was the son of count Roger I of Carcassonne and Adelaide de Melgueil.  His elder brother, Raymond I of Carcassonne inherited the county of Carcassonne and the remaining part of the lordship of Comminges.  Bernard Roger's comital status is attested in the donation to the abbey of Saint-Hilaire in 1011. During his father's lifetime, Bernard Roger married Garsenda, the heiress of the county of Bigorre.

He built the square tower of the castle at Foix in France and made it his capital, from which a town grew. He had endowed the monastery at Foix and in it he was buried when he died at the age of 72.

Marriage and issue
Bernard-Roger and Gersenda had:
Bernard II of Foix, count of Bigorre, took the County of Bigorre.
Roger I of Foix, count of Foix, became the first count of Foix, which included the castles of Castelpenent, Roquemaure, Lordat, and several within the county of Toulouse.
Peter of Foix, lord of Couserans, inherited the lordship of Couserans.
Ermesinda married King Ramiro I of Aragon
Marjorie, married Pons, Count of Toulouse
Stephanie, married García Sánchez III of Navarre

Notes

References

Sources

External links
  Histoire des comtes de Foix 

960s births
Year of birth uncertain
1030s deaths
Year of death uncertain
House of Foix
Foix, Bernard Roger of
Counts of Foix
Counts of Bigorre
Foix, Bernard Roger of